The 2005 Three Days of De Panne was the 29th edition of the Three Days of De Panne cycle race and was held on 29 March to 31 March 2005. The race started in Middelkerke and finished in De Panne. The race was won by Stijn Devolder.

General classification

References

Three Days of Bruges–De Panne
2005 in Belgian sport